Proto-Sami is the hypothetical, reconstructed common ancestor of the Sami languages. It is a descendant of the Proto-Uralic language.

Homeland and expansion
Although the current Sami languages are spoken much further to the north and west, Proto-Sami was likely spoken in the area of modern-day Southwestern Finland around the first few centuries CE. Local (in Sápmi) ancestors of the modern Sami people likely still spoke non-Uralic, "Paleoeuropean" languages at this point (see Pre-Finno-Ugric substrate). This situation can be traced in placenames as well as through the analysis of loanwords from Germanic, Baltic and Finnic. Evidence also can be found for the existence of language varieties closely related to but likely distinct from Sami proper having been spoken further east, with a limit around Lake Beloye.

Separation of the main branches (West Sami and East Sami) is also likely to have occurred in southern Finland, with these later independently spreading north into Sápmi. The exact routes of this are not clear: it is possible Western Sami entered Scandinavia across Kvarken rather than via land. Concurrently, Finnic languages that would eventually end up becoming modern-day Finnish and Karelian were being adopted in the southern end of the Proto-Sami area, likely in connection with the introduction of agriculture, a process that continued until the 19th century, leading to the extirpation of original Sami languages in Karelia and all but northernmost Finland.

Phonology

Consonants
The Proto-Sami consonant inventory is mostly faithfully retained from Proto-Uralic, and is considerably smaller than what is typically found in modern Sami languages. There were 16 contrastive consonants, most of which could however occur both short and geminate:

Stop and affricate consonants were split in three main allophones with respect to phonation:

The spirant  also had two allophones, voiceless  occurring word-initially and syllable-finally, and voiced  elsewhere.

Consonant gradation

A detailed system of allophony is reconstructible, known as consonant gradation. Gradation applied to all intervocalic single consonants as well as all consonant clusters. This is unlike gradation in the related Proto-Finnic and its descendants, where it applied only to a subset. The conditioning factor was the same, however: the weak grade occurred if the following syllable was closed, the strong grade if it was open. This difference was originally probably realized as length:

 A single consonant was short in the weak grade, e.g. , half-long in the strong grade 
 A geminate consonant was long  in the weak grade, overlong  in the strong grade
 A consonant cluster had a short 1st member in the weak grade, e.g. , a half-long one in the strong grade, 

Gradation only applied after a stressed syllable; after an unstressed syllable all medial consonants appeared in the weak grade.

In sources on Proto-Sami reconstruction, gradation is often assumed but not indicated graphically. In this article, when it is relevant and necessary to show the distinction, the weak grade is denoted with an inverted breve below the consonant(s): s : s̯, č : č̯, tt : t̯t̯, lk : l̯k̯.

After the phonematization of gradation due to loss of word-final sounds, Sami varieties could be left with as many as four different contrastive degrees of consonant length. This has only been attested in some dialects of Ume Sami. Most other Sami varieties phonemically merged the weak grade of geminates with the strong grade of single consonants, leaving only three lengths. In some Sami languages, other sound developments have left only two or three degrees occurring elsewhere.

Vowels
An asymmetric system of four short and five long vowel segments can be reconstructed.

 The four diphthongs  only occurred in stressed syllables, in complementary distribution with the two long vowels  occurring in unstressed syllables.
  did not generally occur in the last syllable of a word.

Prosody

Stress was not phonemic in Proto-Sami. The first syllable of a word invariably received primary stress. Non-initial syllables of a word received secondary stress, according to a trochaic pattern of alternating secondarily-stressed and unstressed syllables. Odd-numbered syllables (counting from the start) were stressed, while even-numbered syllables were unstressed. The last syllable of a word was never stressed. Thus, a word could end in either a stressed syllable followed by an unstressed syllable (if the last syllable was even-numbered) or a stressed syllable followed by two unstressed syllables (if the last syllable was odd-numbered). This gave the following pattern, which could be extended indefinitely (P = primary stress, S = secondary stress, _ = no stress):
 P
 P _
 P _ _
 P _ S _
 P _ S _ _
 P _ S _ S _
 etc.

Because the four diphthongs could only occur in stressed syllables, and consonant gradation only occurred after a stressed syllable, this stress pattern led to alternations between vowels in different forms of the same word. These alternations survive in many Sami languages in the form of distinct inflectional classes, with words with a stressed second-last syllable following the so-called "even" or "two-syllable" inflection, and words with an unstressed second-last syllable following the "odd" or "three-syllable" inflection. Weakening and simplification of non-final consonants after unstressed syllables contributed further to the alternation, leading to differences that are sometimes quite striking. For example:

In compounds, which consisted of a combination of several root words, each word retained the stress pattern that it had in isolation, so that that stress remained lexically significant (i.e. could theoretically distinguish compounds from non-compounds). The first syllable of the first part of a compound had the strongest stress, with progressively weaker secondary stress for the first syllables of the remaining parts.

Grammar

Nominals
Nominals, i.e. nouns, adjectives, numerals and pronouns were systematically inflected for two numbers and ten cases. The personal pronouns and possessive suffixes also distinguished the dual number.

Cases
The cases included the core cases nominative, accusative and genitive; the local cases inessive, elative, illative; as well as essive, partitive, comitative and abessive.

The case system shows some parallel developments with the Finnic languages. Like Finnic, the original Uralic locative *-na was repurposed as an essive, the ablative case *-ta became the partitive, and new locative cases were formed from these by infixing *-s-. Sami lacks any equivalent to the Finnic "external" cases beginning with *-l-, however. Moreover, the earliest stages of Samic appear to have used these cases only in the singular, as several of the singular cases do not have a formational counterpart in the plural:
 The accusative plural developed out of the original ablative/partitive plural form, with plural infix -j- + partitive -ta.
 The inessive plural is the original essive plural form, with plural infix -j- + locative -na.
 The illative plural was formed in different ways in the various languages, so that no single form can be reconstructed for Proto-Samic.
 The elative plural was likely formed relatively late as well, as it shows a three-consonant cluster, formed analogically by adding the plural -j- to the singular form.
 The comitative plural was in origin a periphrastic construction consisting of the genitive plural with the noun *kuojmē "companion".
Given the discrepancies in the plural locative cases, it is likely that this part of the case system was still partially in development during the late Proto-Sami period, and developed in subtly different ways in the various descendants. In most Sami languages, the case system has been simplified:
 The partitive has been lost in most western languages.
 In several languages the genitive and accusative singular have coincided, and in Northern Sami this led to an analogical merger in the plural. Southern and Pite Sami still keep the two cases separate.
 A sound change *sn > *st that occurred in the history of several mostly eastern Sami languages caused a merging of the inessive and elative singular, creating a single "locative" case. Several languages merged the plural cases analogically, but some languages chose the former inessive plural form, while others chose the elative plural.

Possession

Verb inflection

 The conditional mood had the mood marker *-kćē- (cognate to the Estonian conditional marker -ks-), to which past tense endings were attached. In Western Sami, a new conditional mood was innovated, consisting of the connegative form of the verb joined to a past-tense form of the copula *leatēk.
 The potential mood had the mood marker *-ńćë- (cognate to the Finnish conditional marker -isi-). It received present-tense endings.

The following non-finite forms were also present:
 Infinitive *-tēk, identical with the Finnic ending *-dak.
 Verbal noun *-mē, identical with the Finnic verbal noun suffix *-ma.
 Present participle *-jē, originally an agent noun suffix, cognate to the Finnic agent noun suffix *-ja.
 Past participle *-më or extended *-mëńćë. The extended form is identical with the Finnish verbal noun/"fourth infinitive" suffix *-minen ~ *-mice-.

Lexicon
The vocabulary reconstructible for Proto-Sami has been catalogued by Lehtiranta (1989), who records approximately 1500 word roots, for which either a pre-Sami ancestry is assured, or whose distribution across the Sami languages reaches at least from Lule Sami to Skolt Sami. Within this sample, loanwords from the Finnic and Scandinavian languages already constitute major subsets, numbering slightly over 150 and 100, respectively.

Development

From Proto-Uralic

  > , a change shared with the Finnic and Mordvinic languages. This change counterfeeds the previous one.
  > .
 Loss of vowel harmony (if it existed). In non-initial syllables, front and back harmonic allophones collapsed into one:  >  and  > .
  > , a development also shared with Finnic and Mordvinic.
  > 
 Vowels are lengthened before .
  >  before a vowel.  is lost elsewhere.
  > 
  > 
  > 

This approximate point of Pre-Sami marks the introduction of the oldest Western Indo-European loanwords from Baltic and Germanic. Loans were also acquired from its southern relative Finnic, substituting the early Finnic sound  with Sami . Likely contemporary to these were the oldest loanwords adapted from extinct Paleo-European substrate languages during the northwestward expansion of Pre-Sami. Prime suspects for words of this origin include replacements of Uralic core vocabulary, or words that display consonant clusters that cannot derive from either PU or any known Indo-European source. A number of the later type can be found in the Finnic languages as well.

Examples:
 PU  > preS  > PS  'uncle'
 PU  > preS  > PS  'glue'
 PU  > preS  > PS  'tree stump'
 PU  > preS  > PS  'to sell'
 Baltic  → preS  > PS  'frost'
 Germanic  'red' → preS  > PS  'iron'
 Germanic  → preS  > PS  'guest'
 Finnic  → preS  > PS  'rear'
 substrate? → preS  > PS  'rock', in place of Uralic 
 substrate? → preS  or  > PS  "wood", in place of Uralic  or 
 substrate? → preS  > PS  'perch' (cf. Finnish ahven)
 substrate? → preS  > PS  'feather' (cf. Finnish höyhen)

Later consonant changes mostly involved the genesis of the consonant gradation system, but also the simplification of various consonant clusters, chiefly in loanwords.
 Geminate fricatives  were introduced in certain loanwords.
  was denasalized before a heterorganic obstruent.
 PU  → PS  'bow'
 PU  → PS  'cavity'

Vowel shift
A fairly late but major development within Sami was a complete upheaval of the vowel system, which has been compared in scope to the Great Vowel Shift of English.

In unstressed syllables, only  were distinguished.

The table below shows the main correspondences:

The processes that added up to this shift can be outlined as follows:

 Lowering:  > , including unstressed . 
 Raising:  >  before a following . There are also irregular examples with  >  (for example *kolmi 'three' > *kʊlmi > Proto-Sami *kolmë > Northern Sami golbma).
 All non-close vowels are lengthened:  > . If earlier long non-close vowels existed, they were merged with their short counterparts by this time.

At this point, the vowel system consisted of only two short vowels  in initial syllables, alongside the full complement of long vowels . After this, several metaphonic changes then occurred that rearranged the distribution of long vowels in stressed syllables.

  >  before .
  >  also elsewhere.
 suggests the following four phases:
 Raising of open vowels before , merging with the un-lowered mid vowels.
 Raising of remaining .
 Backing of remaining . 

The inventory of long vowels in stressed syllables now featured seven members: . However, in native vocabulary  remained in complementary distribution: the closed-mid vowel only occurred before following , the open-mid vowel only before following , .

Further changes then shifted the sound values of the unstressed syllables that had conditioned the above shift:
  > , regardless of following vowels.
  >  before .

Lastly, a number of unconditional shifts adjusted the sound values of the vowel phonemes.
  > , in initial syllables. Word initially,  > .
  > . There likely was an intermediate  for the first of these.
  > .

To what extent the two last changes should be dated to Proto-Sami proper is unclear. It is possible that these are archaisms, and shortening and lowering occurred only after the initial division of Proto-Sami into dialects.
The effects of the vowel shift can be illustrated by the following comparison between Northern Sami, and Finnish, known for retaining vowel values very close to Proto-Uralic. All word pairs correspond to each other regularly:

Towards the modern Sami languages
The main division among the Sami languages is the split between eastern and western Sami.

Changes that appear across the Eastern-Western divide are:
 Denasalisation of clusters of nasal plus homorganic consonant to geminate voiced or partially voiced stops (all except Akkala, Kildin and Ter Sami). This appears to have originally been a Western Sami innovation that then spread to Inari and Skolt Sami, as it was still productive in those languages after the borrowing of certain words that escaped the process in Western Sami. For example, Finnish anteeksi was borrowed into Northern Sami as ándagassii after the change, thus with a newly introduced nasal, while Inari Sami has addâgâs, borrowed before the change and thus lacking the nasal.
 Preaspiration of single stops and affricates (all except Akkala, Kildin and Ter Sami).
 Development of the rare phoneme *θ to *t word-initially. Southern Sami and Ume Sami have *h instead.
 Deaffrication of *c and *č before another consonant. This change occurred in a large area in the middle of the Sami area, with the outliers Southern, Akkala, Kildin, Ter and partly also Skolt Sami preserving the original affricates.

Western Sami
Innovations common to the Western Sami languages:
 Pre-stopped or pre-glottalised nasals develop from original geminate nasals (not in Sea Sami).
 Vocalisation of *š to *j before a stop (not in Sea Sami).
 Metathesis and fortition of *ŋv to *vk.
 Assimilation of *ŋm to *mm, which then becomes pre-stopped/pre-glottalised.
 Merging of clusters of stop plus homorganic nasal with single nasals.

The Southern West Sami languages consist of Southern Sami and Ume Sami, and have a number of further innovations:
 Lengthening of short syllables, either by lengthening stressed  to /ij uv/ in open syllables, or geminating single consonants after other short vowels.
 Stressed  are raised to /i u/ in open syllables (in Ume Sami only if the next vowel is not ).
 Reduction of consonant gradation. It is only partly present in Ume Sami, and entirely lost in Southern Sami.

The Northern West Sami languages consist of Pite Sami, Lule Sami and Northern Sami. They have one important common innovation:
 Pre-stopped or pre-glottalised nasals develop also from strong-grade single nasals (not in Sea Sami).

Pite Sami and Lule Sami form their own smaller subgroup of shared innovations, which might be termed Northwestern West Sami:
 2nd syllable  is assimilated to /o/ after 1st syllable /o/.
 The distinction between single and geminate stops ( etc.) is neutralized after the liquids /l/, /r/.

Northern Sami by itself has its own unique changes:
 Change of *p to *k in clusters before a stop or sibilant.
 Merging of accusative and genitive cases.
 Merging of the inessive into the elative to form a common locative case, with the ending used depending on dialect.
 Loss of the past tense of the negative verb, in favour of a construction using the present tense of the negative verb with the past participle (like Finnish).

Eastern Sami
The Eastern Sami languages have the following innovations:
 Contraction of syllables before *nč.
 Development of ŋ to v before another labial sonorant.
 Merging of clusters of stop plus homorganic nasal with geminate nasals.

The Mainland East Sami languages, Inari Sami, Skolt Sami and Akkala Sami, share further innovations:
 Gemination of  even in the weak grade.

Skolt and Akkala Sami moreover share:
 Loss of final unstressed vowels.
 Development of stressed  to /e o/ under certain conditions.

Peninsular East (Kola) Sami, consisting of Kildin Sami and Ter Sami, share:
 Loss of  after a consonant between unstressed syllables.

Overview

Reflexes in parentheses are retentions found in certain subdialects. These likely indicate an earlier Eastern Sami substratum.

Umlaut

In the history of Proto-Sami, some sound changes were triggered or prevented by the nature of the vowel in the next syllable. Such changes continued to occur in the modern Sami languages, but differently in each. Due to the similarity with Germanic umlaut, these phenomena are termed "umlaut" as well.

The following gives a comparative overview of each possible Proto-Sami vowel in the first syllable, with the outcomes that are found in each language for each second-syllable vowel.

Long open

Long open-mid

 In Ume Sami, eä appears before a quantity 3 consonant, iä or ie before a quantity 1 or 2 consonant.
 In Pite Sami, ä appears before a quantity 3 consonant, ie before a quantity 1 or 2 consonant.
 In Lule Sami, ä and oa appear before a quantity 3 consonant, e and å̄ before a quantity 1 or 2 consonant, if a short vowel follows.
 In Skolt Sami, iẹʹ and uẹʹ appear before a quantity 2 consonant, eäʹ and uäʹ otherwise.

Long close-mid

 In Ume Sami, eä appears before a quantity 3 consonant, iä before a quantity 1 or 2 consonant. Some dialects have a pattern more like Pite Sami, with ua or uä before a quantity 3 consonant, and uo or uö before a quantity 1 or 2 consonant.
 In Pite Sami, ä and ua or uä appear before a quantity 3 consonant, ie and uo before a quantity 1 or 2 consonant.
 In Lule Sami, original *ie does not undergo umlaut by regular sound change, but almost all e-stems have acquired umlaut by analogy with original *ea, as the two vowels fall together before original *ē.

Short mid

Short close

 In Kildin Sami,  is written after the letter ,  in all other cases.

Notes

References

External links
 Álgu: etymological database of the Sami languages

Sami
Sámi languages